John William Augustine Sanford Jr. (November 3, 1825 – August 7, 1913) was a lawyer, Alabama Supreme Court clerk, and Attorney General of Alabama for three terms. He was born in Milledgeville, Georgia. John W. A. Sanford of Georgia was his father. 

Sanford Jr. graduated from Oglethorpe University November 13, 1844, with a B.A., Harvard university in 1851 with a B.L., and  University of Alabama in 1878 with an LL.D. He was admitted to the bar October 19, 1852.
He was a Democrat and supported secession after Abraham Lincoln's election as president. He served as an officer in the Confederate Army. During the war he wrote to Confederate Attorney General Thomas H. Watts seeking the transfer and promotion of his brother-in-law.

March 7, 1860, in Montgomery to He married Sallie Maria Taylor, daughter of Col. William H. Taylor, in Montgomery on March 7, 1860.  They had a daughter Valine and a son John W. A. Sanford III who married Minnie Smoot of Mobile. They had several grandchildren. 

He attended the Alabama Constitutional Convention of 1901.

References

Alabama Democrats
Oglethorpe University alumni
1825 births
1913 deaths
19th-century American lawyers
University of Alabama School of Law alumni
Alabama Attorneys General
Harvard Law School alumni
19th-century American politicians
20th-century American politicians
Confederate States Army officers
20th-century American lawyers
People from Milledgeville, Georgia